The 1919 Stanley Cup playoffs were played from February 22 to March 29. The finals, between the National Hockey League (NHL) champion Montreal Canadiens and the Pacific Coast Hockey Association (PCHA) champion Seattle Metropolitans, ended  after five games due to the Spanish flu outbreak, with the teams tied at two wins each with one tie. After the series, the Canadiens' manager attempted to award the Cup to Seattle, but the Seattle team refused it; both teams' names are engraved on the Cup as co-champions.  It was the only time in the history of the Stanley Cup that it was not awarded due to a no-decision after playoffs were held.

NHL Championship

PCHA Championship

Seattle Metropolitans won the championship.

Finals

References

March 1919 sports events
Stanley